Soup Kitchen in Arroios (Portuguese: Sopa dos Pobres em Arroios) is an etching by Domingos Sequeira, from 1813.

Description 
The painting is an etching on paper with overall dimensions  of 42 x 78 centimeters. It is in the collection of the Biblioteca Nacional de Portugal, in Lisbon.

Analysis 
The etching scene shows the retreat of refugees around Lisbon, and food distribution.

References 

Portuguese art
19th-century etchings